Frank Black and the Catholics is the debut album from Frank Black and the Catholics, released in 1998. The backing group on this album performed on Black's previous album, The Cult of Ray, but the group name was first adopted on this release. The album was recorded live to two-track tape over the course of two days in 1997, but a protracted dispute with Black's label American Recordings, reportedly over the "raw" sound of the recordings, delayed its release for 18 months. The album was released in June 1998 in the MP3 format on GoodNoise.com (precursor to eMusic) and was the first album by a major artist to be commercially released on the Internet. The album was then released in the fall of 1998 by SpinART records in the US. During the interim, Lyle Workman left the group and was replaced by Rich Gilbert, and Black prepared the follow-up, Pistolero.

Track listing
The track listing is sequenced in alphabetical order.

Track #8, "Six-Sixty-Six", is a cover of a song by Larry Norman that originally appeared on the 1976 album In Another Land. Frank Black had long admired Norman, naming the first Pixies album, Come On Pilgrim, after a line in a Norman song. The two were introduced by Bono at a U2 concert and developed a relationship.

Personnel
Credits adapted from the album's liner notes.
Frank Black and the Catholics
Frank Black – guitar, vocals
Scott Boutier – drums
David McCaffery – bass, vocals
Lyle Workman – lead guitar
Technical
Frank Black and the Catholics – producer
Billy Joe Bowers – recording engineer
Nick Raskulinecz – assistant engineer
Eddy Schreyer – mastering engineer
Inertia – design

References

1998 debut albums
Frank Black and the Catholics albums
SpinART Records albums